Nilson David Angulo Ramírez (born 19 June 2003) is an Ecuadorian professional footballer who plays as a forward for Anderlecht.

Club career
In June 2022, Angulo joined Belgian First Division A side Anderlecht on a five-year deal.

International career
In October 2021, Angulo made his senior international debut for Ecuador, playing in a 3–2 friendly win over Mexico.

References

External links

2003 births
Living people
Ecuadorian footballers
Association football forwards
L.D.U. Quito footballers
Ecuadorian Serie A players
Ecuador international footballers
Expatriate footballers in Belgium
R.S.C. Anderlecht players
Ecuadorian expatriate footballers
Ecuadorian expatriate sportspeople in Belgium
Challenger Pro League players
RSCA Futures players